Pawan Shankar is an Indian film and television actor who played the title role in the serial Siddhant on Star One. He holds an MBA in finance from Institute of Management Technology (IMT), Ghaziabad. An alumnus of Allahabad's St. Joseph's College, Shankar graduated with a Gold Medal from Allahabad University.

Corporate life 
Mr. Shankar has worked in companies including Triveni Engineering & Industries Ltd., Essar Cellphone, Hutch and ICICI Securities for about 4 years.

Career in acting 
He completed a course in acting from Kishore Namit Kapoor Acting Lab, Mumbai and won the Best Actor Critics Award in the Indian Telly Awards for his performance in Siddhant, a serial that won the best drama award in Indian Television Academy Awards. Shankar was nominated for the Best Actor category in Apsara Awards.

Film critic Subhash K. Jha and others reviewed Shankar's performance in Siddhant favourably. Shankar played the role of Sanjay Apte, a trade union leader, in Thodi Si Zameen Thoda Sa Aasman on Star Plus, well-reviewed by Subhash K. Jha. Smriti Irani played the role of his sister in this series.

Shankar worked as a model for more than 50 advertisements for Indian and Multinational brands. He played the title role in the TV series Vicky Ki Taxi on Real TV Channel.

Shankar was the lead actor in the TV programme Kya Huaa Tera Vaada playing a man in an extra-marital affair on Sony TV produced by Ekta Kapoor.

His short film on relationship 'Adhure Poore Se Hum 2018' won several awards internationally and currently can be seen on Disney Plus Hotstar, Amazon Prime and MX Player. 

Shankar did a negative role (cameo) for the first time in a TV show Guddan Tumse Na Ho Payega concluded in December 2019.

Recent release was Ajay Devgn starrer Bhuj: The Pride of India on 14th August 2021 on Hotstar Disney Multiplex. Shankar plays the role of Antagonist in the film. 

Shankar would be next seen in upcoming Amazon Mumbai Diaries Season 2 as Hasan Rahimtullah and Netflix Film Empire as Vineet Bhai.

Films and television

Awards 

 Best Actor – Drama, Indian Telly Awards for Siddhant 2005
 Siddhant (Title role by Pawan Shankar) was awarded by Hero Honda Indian Television Academy Award 2005 as the Best Serial in 2005
 Siddhant serial nominated for International Emmy's Award 2006. First serial from India to get nomination.
 Nominated, Best Actor Category, Apsara Awards of Producer's Guild Association for Siddhant 2006
 Exhibition Excellence Award 2016 (As MD, Fashionista)
 Bharat Excellence Award 2016 (Individual)
 Indian Award for Excellence 2016 (As MD, Educationista)
 Lead Actor – Honorable mention in a short Film for "You and Me" by The South Film and Arts Academy Festival April 2018 (SCAFA Fest)
 Bronze Award for Best Actor by Independent Shorts Award, Los Angeles April 2018

References

External links

 
 

1975 births
Living people
21st-century Indian male actors
University of Allahabad alumni
Indian male television actors
Institute of Management Technology, Ghaziabad alumni
Male actors in Hindi television
Male actors from Allahabad